Dehd is an American three-piece indie rock band from Chicago formed in 2015. The band consists of members Emily Kempf (b. September 3, 1984) Jason Balla, (b. March 25, 1990) and Eric McGrady (b. June 25, 1988).

History
The band formed in 2015.

Dehd and Fire of Love EP
In 2016, Dehd released a nine track self-titled album, via the label Maximum Pelt.

This was followed by a six track EP, Fire of Love in 2017, via Infinity Cat Recordings.  During the summer of 2017, the band self-recorded its release with borrowed gear in a room in an old Frank Lloyd Wright warehouse.

Water
Dehd released their second LP Water on Fire Talk Records in May 2019.

The track "Wild" from Water was featured in the third episode of season two of The CW series Charmed.

Dehd toured the Netherlands, Germany, the United Kingdom, and France in October 2019, in support of fellow Chicago act Twin Peaks.

Flower of Devotion
Flower of Devotion was released in July 2020, having been pushed back from a spring 2020 release date as a result of the COVID-19 pandemic. The album was met with widespread critical acclaim, with Pitchfork granting the release a "best new music" designation.

On February 14, 2022, Dehd released a new single titled "Bad Love" on Fat Possum Records.

Musical style and influences

Dehd's sound is characterized by reverb-heavy guitar, blunt drumming, and the use of idiosyncratic vocals, which include drawls, call-and response, yelping, and frequent use of counter-melody. Commentators have compared the resulting spareness of the sound to the genre of post-punk, but additional comparisons can be made to wall of sound, surf rock and dream pop.

Jason Balla has cited Cocteau Twins, Broadcast, and Cate Le Bon as influences, while Emily Kempf has referenced the works of James Brown, Roy Orbison, and Dolly Parton as having shaped their musical approach.

Discography

LPs
2016: Dehd
2019: Water
2020: Flower of Devotion
2021: Flower of Devotion Remixed
2022: Blue Skies

Non-Album Singles and EPs
2017: Fire of Love (EP)
2018: Dying For (Single)
2019: Letter (Single)

References

Songwriters from Illinois
Musical groups from Chicago
Rock music groups from Illinois
Garage rock groups from Illinois
Indie rock musical groups from Illinois
2015 establishments in Illinois
Musical groups established in 2015